Karsten Schmeling (born 13 January 1962 in Hennigsdorf, Brandenburg)  is a German rower, who competed for the SG Dynamo Potsdam / Sportvereinigung (SV) Dynamo. In October 1986, he was awarded a Patriotic Order of Merit in gold (first class) for his sporting success.

References 

1962 births
Living people
People from Hennigsdorf
East German male rowers
Olympic medalists in rowing
World Rowing Championships medalists for East Germany
Medalists at the 1988 Summer Olympics
Olympic gold medalists for East Germany
Olympic rowers of East Germany
Rowers at the 1988 Summer Olympics
Recipients of the Patriotic Order of Merit in gold
Sportspeople from Brandenburg